Zipper Interactive was an American video game developer based in Redmond, Washington and part of SCE Worldwide Studios. It was founded in June 1995 by Jim Bosler and Brian Soderberg. It created many different games, including the SOCOM U.S. Navy SEALs series of games. SOCOM U.S. Navy SEALs was created in collaboration with the Naval Special Warfare Command and published by Sony Computer Entertainment for the PlayStation 2. On January 25, 2006, Sony announced that it had acquired Zipper Interactive to add it to its group of development studios.

Games

Closure
On March 29, 2012, Sony announced that it would be closing Zipper Interactive due to "resource re-alignment." The closure of Zipper Interactive was later confirmed by Sony Computer Entertainment the next day on March 30, 2012. Prior to its closure, Zipper Interactive were working on two unannounced titles for the PlayStation 4 before both projects were cancelled once the closing was complete. One was another entry in the SOCOM U.S. Navy SEALs series, and the other was a first-person shooter meant to be a new IP.

References

External links 
 

Advergaming companies
American companies established in 1995
American companies disestablished in 2012
Defunct companies based in Redmond, Washington
Video game companies established in 1995
Software companies based in Washington (state)
Defunct companies based in Washington (state)
PlayStation Studios
Defunct video game companies of the United States
Video game development companies
2006 mergers and acquisitions
Video game companies disestablished in 2012
1995 establishments in Washington (state)
2012 disestablishments in Washington (state)